Pavol Hamžík (born 20 August 1954) is a former Foreign Minister of Slovakia from 1996 to 1997 in cabinet of Vladimír Mečiar and also member of government of prime minister Mikuláš Dzurinda. He is currently the foreign policy advisor of Robert Fico.

He studied law at Comenius University in Bratislava, finished in 1978. Hamžík also studied diplomacy in Moscow (1989–1991).

Since May 2009 he has been the Slovak ambassador in Ukraine.

References 

1954 births
Living people
Foreign Ministers of Slovakia
People from Trenčín
Ambassadors of Slovakia to Ukraine
Comenius University alumni
Ambassadors of Slovakia to Hungary
Members of the National Council (Slovakia) 1998-2002